Rebirthing may refer to:

Rebirthing-breathwork, a form of alternative medicine mainly consisting of a breathing technique
Attachment therapy, a controversial category of alternative child mental health interventions intended to treat attachment disorders
"Rebirthing" (song), a song by Skillet from the album Comatose
Car rebirthing

See also
Rebirth (disambiguation)